Tanita S. Davis is an American author of young adult novels, best known for her NAACP Image Award-nominated and Coretta Scott King Award-winning novel Mare's War, about two teens going on a roadtrip with her WWII veteran grandmother who tells them about her rebellious past.

Personal life 
Davis was born in San Francisco, California and is the youngest of her biological siblings. She has two adopted siblings. She studied Creative Writing with an emphasis in Prose at Mills College, originally not setting out to write for children, but ultimately wrote an early draft of what would become her fourth published novel, Mare's War, as her thesis. She states that the works of Victor LaValle, Ginu Kamani, and Micheline Aharonian Marcom taught her more about writing than her degree. After graduating from Mills College with an MFA in 2004, she spent five years living in Scotland, where she worked on her PhD before moving back to Northern California.

Davis is married and lives in Northern California with her husband.

Works 

 Camp Chronicles Series
 Summer of Friends (Review & Herald Publishing, 1999)
 Summer of Memories (Review & Herald Publishing, 2000)
 A la Carte (Knopf Books for Young Readers, 2008)
 Mare's War (Knopf Books for Young Readers, 2009)
 Happy Families (Knopf Books for Young Readers, 2012)
 Peas and Carrots (Knopf Books for Young Readers, 2016)
 Serena Says (Katherine Tegen Books, 2020)
 Partly Cloudy (Katherine Tegen Books, 2021)
 Figure It Out, Henri Weldon (HarperCollins US, 2023)

Awards 
Won

 2010 Coretta Scott King Honor for Mare's War

Nominated

 2010 NAACP Image Award in Outstanding Literary Work - Youth/Teens category for Mare's War

References 

Living people
Women writers of young adult literature
Year of birth missing (living people)
21st-century American women writers
21st-century African-American writers
Mills College alumni
Writers from San Francisco
21st-century African-American women writers
American young adult novelists